Boxcar Books was a non-profit, independent bookstore, infoshop, and community center in Bloomington, Indiana. Collectively run by volunteers, Boxcar Books was "one of the highest-volume zine sellers" in the United States. According to its website, the store existed to "promote reading, self-education, social equality, and social welfare through increased accessibility to literature and workshops." Boxcar Books was for a time also the home of the Midwest Pages to Prisoners Project, a non-profit organization that distributes books and reading materials to prisoners.  By the end of 2017, Boxcar Books had closed their operations.

History
Boxcar Books and Community Center was founded by Oliver Haimson and Matthew Turissini in 2001. The bookstore included a wide selection of new and used nonfiction books with a particular focus on gender studies and "green" lifestyles. In 2008, the bookstore moved to a location closer to Indiana University.

Events
In addition to poetry readings and community events, Boxcar Books regularly used to host the Writers Guild of Bloomington "Prose Reading & Open Mic" on the first Sunday of the month and the "Bloomington Writer Project" every Tuesday afternoon. The bookstore held an annual fundraising event for itself and the Midwest Pages to Prisoners Project called the "Rock n' Roll Prom."

Target of hate groups
Boxcar Books was the target of protests by a white supremacist hate group called the Traditionalist Youth Network.

See also
 Feminist bookstore
 Bluestockings Books
 Iron Rail Book Collective
 Red Emma's Bookstore Coffeehouse
 In Other Words Women's Books and Resources

References

External links
 Boxcar Books - official website

Infoshops
Organizations established in 2001
Feminist bookstores
Independent bookstores of the United States
Feminist organizations in the United States
Bloomington, Indiana